Dry Creek is a  long 2nd order tributary to the Haw River in Chatham County, North Carolina.

Course
Dry Creek rises about 4 miles south-southeast of Silk Hope, North Carolina in Chatham County and then flows northeast to the Haw River upstream of Bynum.

Watershed
Dry Creek drains  of area, receives about 47.4 in/year of precipitation, and has a wetness index of 430.05 and is about 60% forested.

See also
List of rivers of North Carolina

References

Additional maps

Rivers of North Carolina
Rivers of Chatham County, North Carolina